Mike O'Neill is a Canadian singer-songwriter, actor, and screenwriter. Originally from Oshawa, Ontario, he has been based in Halifax, Nova Scotia since 1996. O'Neill was a member of indie-rock band The Inbreds in the 1990s before disbanding the group and embarking on a solo career. He was involved as both sound engineer and actor on the popular Canadian television series Trailer Park Boys.

Biography
O'Neill was a founding member in the 1990s of the Canadian indie-rock band The Inbreds along with the drummer Dave Ullrich. The Inbreds released four albums between 1992 and their breakup in 1998, and O'Neill has since released a handful of albums as a solo artist. Though he played bass guitar in The Inbreds, he has been predominantly a rhythm guitarist as a solo artist.

In 2007, he joined the cast of Trailer Park Boys, appearing in several episodes of the hit series' seventh season, playing the hot-tempered Thomas Collins. His song "Are We Waiting" was featured in the Trailer Park Boys season seven episode "Jump the Cheeseburger". He also worked behind the scenes on the series for several seasons as the sound mixer.

From 2007 to 2010, O'Neill composed music for the Food Network program French Food at Home, for which he won a Gemini Award.

On October 22, 2008, O'Neill and Ullrich played a one-off Inbreds reunion show in Halifax as part of the 2008 Halifax Pop Explosion.

In 2012, O'Neill released his first solo album in eight years, entitled Wild Lines.

The album Colours, a collaboration with Devon Sproule, was released on September 23, 2013, on Tin Angel Records.

O'Neill also collaborated with Trailer Park Boys creator Mike Clattenburg on the screenplays for the 2012 film Moving Day, and the 2014 film Trailer Park Boys: Don't Legalize It. They also co-created the Canadian television comedy series Crawford, which premieres as streaming video on February 2, 2018.

As of 2015, he has joined with Chris Murphy of Sloan and Matt Murphy of The Super Friendz in the supergroup Tuns.

Discography

With the Inbreds
 1992: Hilario
 1994: Kombinator
 1996: It's Sydney or the Bush
 1998: Winning Hearts
 2004: The Kombinator Demos
 2004: B-Sides
 2004: Live in Calgary 1997

With TUNS
 2016: TUNS

Solo
 2000: What Happens Now?
 2004: The Owl
 2012: Wild Lines
 2013: Colours – with Devon Sproule

Compilations
 Our Power (2006): "She Believes in Me"

References

External links
 Mike O'Neill at CBC Radio 3
 Mike O'Neill – official website.

Canadian indie rock musicians
Canadian people of Irish descent
Canadian rock bass guitarists
Canadian rock guitarists
Canadian male guitarists
Canadian rock singers
Canadian male screenwriters
21st-century Canadian screenwriters
Canadian singer-songwriters
Canadian television composers
Canadian Screen Award winners
Living people
Musicians from Halifax, Nova Scotia
Musicians from Oshawa
Place of birth missing (living people)
Queen's University at Kingston alumni
Male bass guitarists
21st-century Canadian bass guitarists
21st-century Canadian male singers
Year of birth missing (living people)
Canadian male singer-songwriters